George Stephenson (1781–1848) was an English engineer, known as the "Father of Railways".

George Stephenson may also refer to:
 
George Stephenson (footballer, born 1900) (1900–1971), England international footballer, later manager at Huddersfield Town
George Stephenson (footballer, born 1865) (1865–?), English footballer for Everton
George Stephenson (impresario) (1874–1918), New Zealand impresario, auctioneer, rugby footballer (1890s)
George Stephenson (politician) (died 1878), American politician
George Stephenson (rugby union) (1901–1970), Ireland international rugby union player, see 1924–25 New Zealand rugby union tour of Britain, Ireland and France
Bob Stephenson (sportsman) (George Robert Stephenson, born 1942), English cricketer, son of the above
George Robert Stephenson (1819–1905), British civil engineer

See also
Stephenson College, Durham, formerly known as George Stephenson College, named after the civil engineer
George Stephenson High School, Killingworth, England
George Stevenson (disambiguation)